Stuart Lake, or Nak'albun ("Mount Pope Lake") in the Carrier (Dakelh) language is a lake situated in the Northern Interior of British Columbia, Canada. The town of Fort St. James is situated by the lake near the outlet (Stuart River or Nak'alkoh - ″Mount Pope River″).

Stuart Lake offers boating, swimming and sunbathing at sandy beaches, fishing, water skiing, viewing ancient aboriginal pictographs, camping, snowmobiling, ice fishing, ice sailing, and dog sledding.  Two provincial park campgrounds, Paarens Beach and Sowchea Bay, are located on the southern shore of the lake, and there are several motels, lodges and private campgrounds in the area.  Moorage is available at several marinas.

Fort St. James has several lumber mills as do several smaller aboriginal communities in the basin. The lake is usually ice-covered from mid-December to early May. Stuart Lake contains rainbow trout, char or lake trout, whitefish, kokanee, Dolly Varden, and burbot fish.

Hydrographical characteristics of the lake
Discharge

History

Villages on Stuart Lake or Nak'albun, were connected to Dakelh villages on Fraser Lake (Nadlehbunk'ut) on an ancient land route called Nyan Wheti Nyan Wheti in Carrier means "The Way Across." The trail was part of the network of trails called the Grease Trail used by the Dakelh people for as a major trade, travel and communication line. the Cheslatta Trail continues south to Cheslatta Lake.

Stuart Lake is important to British Columbia history, being the location of one of the oldest non-native settlements in the province, Fort St. James.  The first non-native to visit the lake was James McDougall in 1806.  McDougall's explorations were undertaken as an assistant to Simon Fraser.
Fraser and other members of his expedition soon established a North West Company trading post, leaving behind for the winter a garrison led by clerk John Stuart, in whose honor the English name of the lake was given.

The original name, in the Dakelh language, is Nak'albun, literally Mt. Pope Lake, after the mountain that overlooks it, Nak'al, known in English as Mt. Pope. The changing of names of the lakes reflects the doctrine of discovery upheld by Canada's colonial government as well as the colonial history of the area.

In 2012, the "Mayor and Council of the District of Fort St. James unanimously voted to adopt a resolution declaring their opposition to the Enbridge Northern Gateway Project." Their decision was based on concerns for "the land base and our fresh water sources.  Of particular concern locally is the crossing of the Stuart River, which accommodates one of the largest sockeye salmon runs in the world, and Pitka Creek which flows into Stuart Lake."

Citations

References 

 
 
Boating the Large Lakes of Northern British Columbia
 
Poser, William J. (1998) Nak'albun/Dzinghubun Whut'enne Bughuni (Stuart/Trembleur Lake Carrier Lexicon). Vanderhoof, BC: Yinka Dene Language Institute. Second edition.

Lakes of British Columbia
Omineca Country
Range 5 Coast Land District